Dobbins (formerly, Dobbin, Dobbins Ranche, Dobbins Ranch, and Dobbin's Ranche) is a census-designated place in Yuba County, California.

Geography
Dobbins is north of Oregon House and south of Bullards Bar Dam. Dobbins has one post office, one general store, three churches, a Grange Hall, one grade school, one charter school, and Lake Francis Resort.

The average snowfall is 3.5 inches, higher than most of California. February has the highest average snowfall with 1.5 inches, followed by January and March with 1 inch average snowfall each.

Most students attend high school in Marysville, or in the Sierra County school district.

According to the United States Census Bureau, the CDP covers an area of 7.8 square miles (20.3 km), 99.08% of it land and 0.92% of it water.

History
The town was settled in 1849, and named for William M. and Mark D. Dobbins, early settlers.  Dobbins was not a mining town originally, but a farm area. There were stage station stops, for teamsters' and their wagons, at what was known as Scott Ranch (three miles below Dobbins- Marysville Rd). Dobbins served as a stage stop until the coming of the automobiles.

The first post office was established in 1851 under the name Dobbins Ranche, which was closed in 1854. The post office returned in 1887 and has operated continuously since then.

Climate
According to the Köppen climate classification system, Dobbins has a hot-summer Mediterranean climate, abbreviated "Csa" on climate maps.

<div style="width:65%">

Demographics

The 2010 United States Census reported that Dobbins had a population of 624. The racial makeup of Dobbins was 517 (82.9%) White, 5 (0.8%) African American, 52 (8.3%) Native American, 6 (1.0%) Asian, 0 (0.0%) Pacific Islander, 9 (1.4%) from other races, and 35 (5.6%) from two or more races. Hispanic or Latino of any race were 28 persons (4.5%).

The Census reported that 624 people (100% of the population) lived in households, 0 (0%) lived in non-institutionalized group quarters, and 0 (0%) were institutionalized.

There were 257 households, out of which 66 (25.7%) had children under the age of 18 living in them, 107 (41.6%) were opposite-sex married couples living together, 25 (9.7%) had a female householder with no husband present, 18 (7.0%) had a male householder with no wife present. There were 14 (5.4%) unmarried opposite-sex partnerships, and 4 (1.6%) domestic partnerships. 78 households (30.4%) were made up of individuals, and 29 (11.3%) had someone living alone who was 65 years of age or older. The average household size was 2.43. There were 150 families (58.4% of all households); the average family size was 3.08.

The population was spread out, with 132 people (21.2%) under the age of 18, 45 people (7.2%) aged 18 to 24, 107 people (17.1%) aged 25 to 44, 242 people (38.8%) aged 45 to 64, and 98 people (15.7%) who were 65 years of age or older. The median age was 47.8 years. For every 100 females, there were 118.2 males. For every 100 females age 18 and over, there were 111.2 males.

The homeowner vacancy rate was 0.6%; the rental vacancy rate was 16.0%. 438 people (70.2% of the population) lived in owner-occupied housing units and 186 people (29.8%) lived in rental housing units.

References

Census-designated places in Yuba County, California
Populated places established in 1849
1849 establishments in California
Census-designated places in California